Queens Road was a proposed railway station in the London Borough of Hackney. The line was  completed in August 1892, but the station was never built.

Services

References

Unbuilt railway stations in the United Kingdom